International Perspectives in Psychology: Research, Practice, Consultation is a peer-reviewed academic journal published by Division 52 of the American Psychological Association. It was established in 2011 and covers research in the psychology of "human behavior and experiences around the globe." The current editor-in-chief is Stuart Carr of Massey University.

References

External links 

 

American Psychological Association academic journals
English-language journals